The Deceivers is a science fiction novel by American writer Alfred Bester. It was first published in 1981 by Wallaby Books/Simon & Schuster.

Synopsis
Rogue Winter has superhuman powers of pattern recognition, which he uses to rescue his kidnapped girlfriend and save the solar system.

Reception
The Deceivers received little attention from critics; The Encyclopedia of Science Fiction later posited that this was the result of a desire to spare Bester's feelings, as the novel "is not good." Science fiction scholar Jad Smith has described it as a "busy, overwritten pastiche" of Bester's 1956 The Stars My Destination. David Langford called it "mildly good fun" and praised Bester's "colourful imagination and general wildness", but declared it substandard for Bester (while still superior to his other then-recent work), describing its characters as "dilettantes" who "never reach (the) sheer peaks of obsessiveness that powered (Bester's) early novels", and noting in particular the presence of "a narrator who removes all possible suspense" by telling readers the ending in advance.

References

External links
  

1981 American novels
American science fiction novels 
Novels by Alfred Bester 
1981 science fiction novels
Books with cover art by Michael Whelan